Madan-e Gach may refer to:
 Madan-e Gach, Mazandaran